Joe Dassin (commonly called Si tu t'appelles Mélancolie after the second track on side 1) is the eighth French studio album by Joe Dassin. It came out in 1974 on CBS Disques.

There was also a 1975 version that included the song "L'Été indien" (as the first track on side 1) instead of "Six jours à la campagne" *(that was the fourth track on side 1 in the original edition).

Track listing

References

External links 
 

1974 albums
Joe Dassin albums
CBS Disques albums

Albums produced by Jacques Plait